Jason Pearce is an English footballer.

Jason Pearce may also refer to:

Jason Pearce, member of US Christian music group, Rescue (a cappella group)
Jason Pearce (pole vaulter), Athletics at the 1999 Pan American Games

See also
Jason Pierce, English musician
Jason Pierce (drummer), Canadian drummer